McClintock is a surname.

McClintock may also refer to:

Places
 M'Clintock Channel, also spelled McClintock, a waterway in Canada
 MacKlintok Island, also spelled McClintock, Franz Josef Land, Russia
 McClintock Peak, Montana
 Mount McClintock, Antarctica
 McClintock Point, Antarctica
 McClintock Ridge, Antarctica

Arts and entertainment
 McLintock!, a 1963 American film starring John Wayne and Maureen O'Hara
 Phineas McClintock, pseudonym of Prison Break TV series character Michael Scofield 
 Harlan "Mountain" McClintock, a character in the 1956 film Requiem for a Heavyweight

Other uses
 McClintock Prize for plant genetics and genome studies
 McClintock High School, Tempe, Arizona, United States
 McClintock House (disambiguation)
 McClintock v Department of Constitutional Affairs, a 2008 UK employment discrimination law case
 20440 McClintock, an asteroid discovered in 1999

See also 
 McClintock effect, also known as menstrual synchrony, or as the dormitory effect
 , a US ship launched in 1943
 McClintic
 McClinton (disambiguation)